José Rafael Larraín Moxó (born 16 February 1813–28 December 1892) was a Chilean politician who served as President of the Senate of Chile.

External links
 BCN Profile

1813 births
1892 deaths
Chilean people
Chilean people of Basque descent
Chilean people of Catalan descent
People from Maipo Province
People from Viluco
Chilean politicians
Presidents of the Senate of Chile
Conservative Party (Chile) politicians
Members of the Senate of Chile